Federal State Unitary Enterprise "NL Dukhov All-Russian Scientific Research Institute of Automation" (VNIIA) – is an enterprise of the State Atomic Energy Corporation Rosatom. Located in Moscow, the main sphere of activity is the development of nuclear weapons and their components.

Types of activity at the Institute 

The Institute deals with defense and industrial topics. Main directions of activity:

 nuclear weapons
 systems for detonating nuclear charges
 non-nuclear components and devices for automatics of nuclear weapons
 automatic test equipment
 improving the safety of nuclear weapons
 production of automated process control systems for nuclear power plants

Controversies 
In 2015, the institute demolished the apartment building N. F. Rzhevsky (which was one of its buildings) – a building built in 1902, located at Sushchevskaya street No. 16, p. 8 within the boundaries of cultural heritage protection zones. Moscow City Cultural Heritage Department considered the demolition "unauthorized". The Moscow government, which has no authority to stop demolition work in territory under the jurisdiction of the Ministry of Defense, condemned the actions of the NL Dukhov VNIIA, stressing that "there are moral principles that need to be observed... The actions of VNIIA are fundamentally wrong and require verification by the relevant state authorities."

History 
The institute was established in 1954 as branch No. 1 KB-11 of the Russian Federal Nuclear Center (VNIIEF), in Sarov, Russia (formerly named Arzamas-16). In 1956, the institute (VNIIA) was separated into an independent design bureau KB-25 of the Ministry of Medium Machine Building. Since then the company has changed the name repeatedly: since 1966 – the "Aviapribor" plant, since 1969 – the Research Institute of Aviation Automation, since 1986 – the All-Union Research Institute of Automation named after N.L.Dukhova, and from 1992 to the present – FSUE Dukhov Automatics Research Institute.

Staff members 
 1954—1964: Lieutenant General of ITS N. L. Dukhov - Director and Chief Designer.
 1964—1987: Lieutenant General N. I. Pavlov – Director.
 1964—1997: A. A. Brish – Chief Designer.
 1987—2008: Yu. N. Barmakov – Director, Lenin Prize Laureate and USSR State Prize Laureate. 
 1997—2015: G. A. Smirnov – Chief Designer, Russian Federation State Prize Laureate and Russian Federation Prize of the Government. 
 2008: S. Yu. Loparev – Director, Russian Federation State Prize Laureate.
 2015: A. V. Sidorov – Chief Designer.

See also

Soviet atomic bomb project
Timeline of nuclear weapons development
All-Russian Scientific Research Institute of Experimental Physics
All-Russian Scientific Research Institute Of Technical Physics
Lawrence Livermore National Laboratory
Los Alamos National Laboratory
Sandia National Laboratories

References

External links 
 Официальный сайт ВНИИА имени Н. Л. Духова
 Manuscript on the History of the Soviet Nuclear Weapons and Nuclear Infrastructure // ISTC

Rosatom
Nuclear research institutes in Russia
Research institutes in Russia
Federal State Unitary Enterprises of Russia
Ministry of the Atomic Energy Industry (Soviet Union)
Research institutes in the Soviet Union
Nuclear technology in the Soviet Union
Companies based in Moscow